Sambada may refer to:
 Sambada (dance), a Brazilian folk dance, one of the precursors of samba
 Sambada (newspaper), Indian newspaper
 Sambada, a 2007 EP by Solomun (musician)

See also 
 Lambada, another Brazilian dance
 Zambada, a surname
 Sambata (disambiguation)